Babis Kotridis (30 October 1928 – 18 April 2009) was a Greek professional footballer. He played in 18 matches for the Greece national football team from 1951 to 1957. He was also part of Greece's team for the 1952 Summer Olympics, and their qualification matches for the 1954 FIFA World Cup.

Honours

Olympiacos
Panhellenic Championship: 1946–47, 1947–48, 1950–51, 1953–54, 1954–55, 1955–56, 1956–57, 1957–58, 1958–59
Greek Cup: 1946–47, 1950–51, 1951–52, 1952–53, 1953–54, 1956–57, 1957–58, 1958–59, 1959–60, 1960–61

See also
List of one-club men in association football

References

External links

1928 births
2009 deaths
Greece international footballers
Footballers from Athens
Greek footballers
Association football midfielders
Olympiacos F.C. players